Einar Nordlie (29 April 1896 – 23 November 1966) was a Norwegian footballer. He played in one match for the Norway national football team in 1918.

References

External links
 

1896 births
1966 deaths
Norwegian footballers
Norway international footballers
Place of birth missing
Association footballers not categorized by position